Uncial 083 (in the Gregory-Aland numbering), ε 31 (Soden), is a Greek uncial manuscript of the New Testament, dated paleographically to the 6th/7th century. The codex now is located at the Russian National Library (Gr. 10) in Saint Petersburg.

Description 

The manuscript contains a small part of the Gospel of John 1:25-41; 2:9-4:14,34-49, on 6 parchment leaves (28 by 26 cm). The text is written in two columns per page, 25 lines per page, in large uncial letters. It has no accents, breathings, or punctuation. The text is divided according to the Ammonian Sections, with a references to the Eusebian Canons. The Old Testament quotations are marker on the margin by inverted comma (>>).

Currently it is dated by the INTF to the 6th or 7th century.

It came from the same codex as manuscript Uncial 0112. It contains Gospel of Mark 14:29-45; 15:27-16:8, and the shorter Markan ending on 4 leaves. It was found by J. Rendel Harris. Harris published its text. It is now located at the Saint Catherine's Monastery, Sinai Harris (12, 4 ff.). 

From the same codex as manuscript Uncial 0235. It contains Gospel of Mark 13:12-14.16-19.21-24.26-28 on 1 leaf (fragments). 
The fragment is located now in the Russian National Library (O. 149) in Saint Petersburg.

Text 
The Greek text of this codex is a representative of the Alexandrian text-type, with some alien readings. Kurt Aland placed it to Category II.

It contains Mark 15:28.

In John 1:28 it has textual variant Βηθαβαρα together with the manuscripts C2 K, Ψ, 0113, f1, f13 and Byz. Other manuscripts have βηθανια.

In John 3:12 it has textual variant πιστευετε (you believe) – instead of πιστευσετε (you will believe) – together with the manuscripts Papyrus 75 and Uncial 050.

See also 
 List of New Testament uncials
 Textual criticism

References

Further reading 
 Constantin von Tischendorf, Notitia editionis codicis Bibliorum Sinaitici (Leipzig: 1860), p. 50
 Agnes Smith Lewis, Studia Sinaitica, Nr. 1, London 1894, p. 103, 104. (Uncial 0112)
 U. B. Schmid, D. C. Parker, W. J. Elliott, The Gospel according to St. John: The majuscules (Brill 2007), pp. 69-80. [text of the codex in the Gospel of John]
 J. Rendel Harris, Biblical fragments from Mount Sinai (C. J. Clay and Sons: London 1890), pp. XII-XIII, 48-52.

External links 

 Uncial 083 at the Wieland Willker, "Textual Commentary" 
 

Greek New Testament uncials
6th-century biblical manuscripts
National Library of Russia collection